Lelese is a commune in Hunedoara County, Transylvania, Romania. It is composed of four villages: Cerișor (Cserisor), Lelese, Runcu Mare (Nagyrunk) and Sohodol (Szohodol).

References

Communes in Hunedoara County
Localities in Transylvania